Fetreh Zamin (also Romanized as Feţreh Zamīn; also known as Vatreh Zamīn) is a village in Zhavarud-e Gharbi Rural District, Kalatrazan District, Sanandaj County, Kurdistan Province, Iran. At the 2006 census, its population was 85, in 18 families. The village is populated by Kurds.

References 

Towns and villages in Sanandaj County
Kurdish settlements in Kurdistan Province